Davor Špehar (born 9 February 1988) is a retired Croatian football player.

Career
Špehar started his career in the Dinamo Zagreb academy, a constant fixture of Croatia U-17 and Croatia U-19 teams between 2003 and 2007. While he was still eligible to play for the U-19 team, he was sent on loan to NK Bjelovar in the Druga HNL. Dinamo did not sign a professional contract with him, however, so he moved, aged 19, to the Druga HNL side NK Hrvatski Dragovoljac. He remained at the club for the following 7 seasons, playing mostly at the center-back position, including their 10/11 and 13/14 Prva HNL bouts. During the latter, he achieved a feat unique for the league - scoring 2 goals (his only goals of the season) and an own goal in the 2-2 match against RNK Split.

In the summer of 2014, following Dragovoljac's relegation, he joined NK Osijek. After a season at the club, Špehar moved on to the second-tier NK Lučko, followed by a year at the third-tier NK Vinogradar and one more at fourth-tier Sesvetski Kraljevec before retiring from football at the end of 2017.

References

External links
 
 

1988 births
Living people
Footballers from Zagreb
Croatian footballers
Croatia youth international footballers
Association football defenders
NK Bjelovar players
NK Hrvatski Dragovoljac players
NK Osijek players
NK Lučko players
NK Vinogradar players
Croatian Football League players
First Football League (Croatia) players